The Associação Desportiva Classista Intelli are a professional Brazilian futsal club from Orlândia, São Paulo. They play in the Liga Futsal. The club play their home games at Ginásio Maurício Leite de Moraes.

Titles

National
 Liga Futsal: 2012, 2013
 Campeonato Paulista de Futsal A1: 2003, 2010, 2011

Continental
 Copa Libertadores de Futsal: 2013

Current squad

Notable players
 Falcão

Stadium
The club plays its home matches at Ginásio Maurício Leite de Moraes, which has a maximum capacity of 3,000 people.

References

External links

 Official website

 
Futsal clubs established in 1977
1977 establishments in Brazil
Futsal clubs in Brazil